Sir James George Lee Steere  (4 July 18301 December 1903) was a Western Australian politician and a prominent member of the six hungry families.

Biography

Early life
James Steere was born on 4 July 1830 in Ockley, Surrey, England. He was the third of six sons of Lee Steere of Jayes, who was a leading resident and landed proprietor in the county (including High Sheriff in 1848), and his wife Anne,  Watson. He was educated at Clapham Grammar School.

Career
He became a midshipman in the merchant service and was at sea for fifteen years. His last position was commander of the Devonshire, well-known East Indiaman.

Early in 1860, he emigrated to Western Australia and leased 100,000 acres (400 km²) of land in the southern part of the colony. In 1867, he was one of the first elected members of the Western Australian Legislative Council, won his seat again in 1870, and was then chosen leader of the elected members. In 1880, he lost his seat by one vote but almost immediately became a nominee member. He was made a member of the Executive Council in 1884 and two years later was elected Speaker. In 1890, he was elected a member of the Western Australian Legislative Assembly under responsible government and was unanimously elected Speaker. He held this position for the remainder of his life.

He represented Western Australia at the federal conventions of 1891 and 1897, and was a member of the constitutional committee on each occasion. He was knighted in 1888, and created a Knight Commander of the Order of St Michael and St George (KCMG) in the New Year Honours list January 1900. He was regarded as an able, upright and hardworking member of the community. A good constitutional authority and an able Speaker, he was held in great respect by all parties in the house and by the public generally.

Personal life
He married Catherine Anne Leake, daughter of Sir Luke Leake, in 1859. They had 15 children, 11 of whom outlived him. Catherine died on 6 November 1922.

Death
He died in Perth, Western Australia, on 1 December 1903, and was buried at Karrakatta Cemetery. Artist Florence Fuller posthumously painted his portrait, which was acquired by the Art Gallery of Western Australia.

Notes

References

 
 
 

1830 births
1903 deaths
Members of the Western Australian Legislative Council
Members of the Western Australian Legislative Assembly
Speakers of the Western Australian Legislative Assembly
Settlers of Western Australia
English emigrants to Australia
Australian Knights Bachelor
Australian Knights Commander of the Order of St Michael and St George
Australian politicians awarded knighthoods
Politicians awarded knighthoods
19th-century Australian politicians
Burials at Karrakatta Cemetery